Cephalostenus elegans is a species of darkling beetles in the subfamily Tenebrioninae. It is found in Greece.

References

External links 

 Cephalostenus elegans at Fauna Europaea

Tenebrioninae
Beetles described in 1832
Beetles of Europe
Taxa named by Gaspard Auguste Brullé